The 2nd Saturn Awards were awarded to media properties and personalities deemed by the Academy of Science Fiction, Fantasy and Horror Films to be the best in science fiction, fantasy and horror released in year 1974. They were awarded on January 7, 1975.

In this ceremony the  awards categories  were expanded from two to ten, as opposed to the previous ceremony, where only two categories existed.

Below is a complete list of nominees and winners. Winners are highlighted in bold.

Best Special Effects
The Exorcist -  Marcel VercoutereBest MusicBernard Herrmann
For his career.

Best Writer
The Exorcist -  William Peter BlattyBest Fantasy FilmThe Golden Voyage of Sinbad

Best Horror Film
 The Exorcist
 Arnold
 Don't Look Now
 Terror House
 The Legend of Hell House
 Death Line
 Schlock
 Scream Blacula Scream
 Sisters
 Tales That Witness Madness
 Terror in the Wax Museum
 Theater of Blood
 The Vault of Horror

Best Science Fiction Film
 Soylent Green
 Battle for the Planet of the Apes
 The Day of the Dolphin
 The Neptune Factor
 Sleeper
 Beware! The Blob
 Sssssss
 Westworld

Best Make-Up
The Exorcist -   Dick SmithBest Stop Motion AnimationThe Golden Voyage of Sinbad-    Ray Harryhausen

Special Achievement in TelevisionKiller Bees -  Curtis HarringtonSpecial Award
 George Pal Charlton Heston Gloria Swanson Fay Wray Don Fanzo C. Dean Andersson''

References

External links
 Official Saturn Awards website
 https://www.imdb.com/event/ev0000004/1975

Saturn Awards ceremonies
Saturn
Saturn